Magyar Testgyakorlók Köre Budapest Futball Club is a professional football club based in Budapest, Hungary.

Key

Nemzeti Bajnokság I
 Pld = Matches played
 W = Matches won
 D = Matches drawn
 L = Matches lost
 GF = Goals for
 GA = Goals against
 Pts = Points
 Pos = Final position

Hungarian football league system
 NBI = Nemzeti Bajnokság I 
 NBII = Nemzeti Bajnokság II 
 NBIII = Nemzeti Bajnokság III 
 MBI = Megyei Bajnokság I 

Magyar Kupa
 F = Final
 SF = Semi-finals
 QF = Quarter-finals
 R16 = Round of 16
 R32 = Round of 32
 R64 = Round of 64
 R128 = Round of 128

UEFA
 F = Final
 SF = Semi-finals
 QF = Quarter-finals
 Group = Group stage
 PO = Play-offs
 QR3 = Third qualifying round
 QR2 = Second qualifying round
 QR1 = First qualifying round
 PR = Preliminary round

Seasons
As of 22 May 2022.

Notes
Note 1: In the 1940–41 season the far-right salutations appeared at the stadiums. On 26 June 1940, Brüll, Preiszman, and Fodor retired after a press conference claiming that they cannot do anything for the club after the 1939–40 season due to the cheating of the referees. The MTK declared their dissolution. The Hungarian Football Federation suspended the right to play for the club due to the fact that Burko, a Polish Jew player is still present at the club.
Note 2: The season was suspended due to the COVID-19 pandemic.

See also
 List of unbeaten football club seasons

References

External links

 
MTK Budapest